Petersham is a suburb in the Inner West of Sydney, in the state of New South Wales, Australia. Petersham is located 6 kilometres south-west of the Sydney central business district, in the local government area of Inner West Council. Petersham is known for its extensive Portuguese commercial offerings, with many Portuguese businesses and restaurants, although only 156 (1.9%) of the population was actually born in Portugal.

Petersham is bordered by the suburbs of Leichhardt to the north, Stanmore to the east, Marrickville to the south and Lewisham to the west. Taverner's Hill, named after Fred Taverner, is a locality in the western part of the suburb.

History

Major Francis Grose sent workmen to the area in 1793 to clear the bush and plant corn and wheat. He named the area Peters-Ham or Petersham after his native village in Surrey, England.  Petersham remained an agricultural area, winning awards for some of the best crops and stock in the colony in 1803.  Kangaroo hunting was also popular in the area. The name was also used for the surrounding parish.

Robert Wardell (1793–1834) purchased land from many grantees in the district and in 1831 his estate eventually stretched  from Petersham to the Cooks River. Following his murder by escaped convicts in 1834, the estate was subdivided. The train line from Sydney to Parramatta opened in 1855 and trains stopped here from 1857. A platform was built in 1863. The original Petersham post office became Annandale in 1855. Another post office opened as Norwood in May 1860 and was moved to Petersham station in 1870. The first public school opened in 1878.

Petersham municipality was incorporated in 1872. The local council merged with Marrickville and St Peters in 1948 to form the Municipality of Marrickville. In 1916, the Boys' section of Fort Street High School moved to Petersham from Observatory Hill, followed by the Girls' section in 1975.

Wartime plane crash
Mosquito HR576 RAF (UK) disintegrated over the inner western Sydney suburbs of Leichhardt and Petersham on 2 May 1945 during an air test flight. The crew of two were killed but no one on the ground was seriously injured by the falling debris of the Mosquito. The Daily Telegraph of 3 May 1945 stated that two civilians were injured and a total of 18 properties were damaged. Five houses were set on fire by the falling debris.

It was suspected that a violent pull out from a power dive, with its associated high 'g' forces may have led to the structural failure of the aircraft. The two crew members tried to escape from the aircraft but they were not high enough for their parachutes to open. Flight Lieutenant David Rochford of Oxford, England, and Leading Aircraftman (LAC) Charles Boydell from Mosman were both killed. Flight Lieutenant Rochford's body was found in the playground of Petersham Public School while LAC Boydell's body was found on the roof of a railway building about 100 metres away.

Heritage listings
Petersham has a number of heritage-listed sites, including:
 New Canterbury Road: Petersham Reservoir
 23-35 New Canterbury Road: Egyptian Room, Royal Arch Masonic Temple
 Terminus Street: Petersham railway station

Commercial area
A small row of shops lines New Canterbury Road and extends down Audley Street towards the railway station. There are some Portuguese businesses here including several Portuguese restaurants, some of which are renowned for selling traditional styled flame-grilled chicken and cod dishes – Petersham is considered the heart of Sydney's Portuguese community.

Local landmarks include the Petersham Town Hall, the Petersham Reservoir and Petersham Park. Petersham is bordered by Parramatta Road to the north.

Transport
Petersham railway station is on the Inner West & Leppington Line of the Sydney Trains network. Travelling west, all stations services run from the City Circle to Homebush and Parramatta. The station includes an ornate iron pedestrian bridge over the train line. The old station building was built in 1886 in the Victorian Free Classical style. It has been described as "the largest and grandest of the surviving 19th century railway stations in the Sydney area", and is listed on the Register of the National Estate.

The 428, 444, 445 and 412 buses run through Petersham at different points. The 428 runs from Canterbury to Circular Quay, the 444 and 445 run from Campsie to Balmain, and the 412 runs from Campsie to King Street Wharf in the city.

Schools
Fort Street High School, located on Parramatta Road, is the oldest selective school in New South Wales and has 934 students as of 2013. Petersham Public School sits on the Petersham and Lewisham borders, and has 240 students as at 2014. The old public school building located in Gordon Street goes back to 1878. Along with the church in the grounds, it is listed on the Register of the National Estate.
Taverners Hill Public School situated on Elswick Street, is an infants only school with 60 students and recently published its own cook book.

Churches
 All Saints Anglican Church, Petersham.
Petersham Assembly of God, on Audley Street.
Metropolitan Community Church, Sydney (a church with an outreach to the LGBTQI+ community but open to all).
Thai Church: "House of Faith" at Petersham Assembly of God.
Nova Alianca (Portuguese-speaking) at Petersham Assembly of God.

Architecture
Petersham's houses are predominantly terrace houses, similar to those of Summer Hill and Stanmore on the north side of the railway station near Parramatta Road.

Demographics

According to the 2016 census of Population, there were 8,116 people in Petersham. 
 62.4% of people were born in Australia. The most common countries of birth were England 4.2%, New Zealand 2.5%, Portugal 1.9%, China 1.5% and Italy 1.3%.   
 69.7% of people only spoke English at home. Other languages spoken at home included Portuguese 2.9%, Greek 2.6%, Spanish 1.9%, Italian 1.9% and Mandarin 1.8%. 
 The most common responses for religion in the 2016 Census were No Religion, 43.5%, Catholic 21.7%, Not stated 12.5%, Anglican 7.0% and Eastern Orthodox 3.8%.

Notable residents
 Keith Chisholm MC DFM (1918–1991) was born in Petersham
 Percy Hordern (1864–1926) Alderman and Mayor of Petersham Council and a member of the New South Wales Legislative Council
Alick Kay, member of the New South Wales Legislative Assembly

Culture
Local events include the annual Audley Street festival (Bairro Português), which is a celebration of the suburb's Portuguese ties. Petersham is also home to the Petersham Bowling Club and Petersham RSL Club.

References

External links

Crash of a Mosquito over suburbs of Sydney on 2 May 1945 Includes eyewitness accounts by children at the school.

 
Suburbs of Sydney
Inner West
Portuguese-Australian culture